Sven Audun Nordin (born 6 February 1957 in Oslo) is a Norwegian actor. He was hired by Oslo Nye Teater in the autumn of 1981 and had his debut in the play "Vikinger" by Johan Borgen. He is best known for his roles as Nils in the situation comedy Mot i brøstet and Kjell Bjarne in the Academy Award–nominated film Elling.

Select filmography
1985: The Last Place on Earth as Trygve Gran
1985: Rød snø (TV series)
1987: Over grensen as Jensen, a witness
1987: På stigende kurs
1990: Smykketyven
1993: Mot i brøstet (TV series)
1995: Pakten
1999: Suffløsen
2001: Elling
2002: Ice Age (Norwegian dub) as Diego
2002: Shackleton (TV)
2002: I Am Dina
2003: Mamma, pappa, barn
2005: Deadline Torp (Tv series)
2005: An Enemy of the people
2005: Love Me Tomorrow
2005: Hos Martin (TV series)
2006: An Immortal Man as Knud Ibsen
2010: Shameless 
2011: Sons of Norway
2012: Lilyhammer
 2012: Two Lives
2014: Børning
2016: Børning-2
2016: A Serious Game
2017: Valkyrien (TV series)
2019: Wisting (TV series)
2021: Rådebank (TV series)

References

External links

1957 births
Living people
Male actors from Oslo
Norwegian male film actors
Norwegian male television actors